This is a list of places in the continent of Africa which have standing links to local communities in other countries. In most cases, the association, especially when formalised by local government, is known as "town twinning" (usually in Europe) or "sister cities" (usually in the rest of the world), and while most of the places included are towns, the list also includes villages, cities, districts, and counties with similar links.

Algeria
Algiers

 Montreal, Canada
 Sofia, Bulgaria

Annaba

 Bizerte, Tunisia
 Yekaterinburg, Russia

Blida

 Dimitrovgrad, Bulgaria
 Kazanlak, Bulgaria
 Metz, France

Biskra
 Makhachkala, Russia

Chlef
 Skopje, North Macedonia

Constantine

 Grenoble, France
 Sousse, Tunisia

Mascara

 Bursa, Turkey
 Elkader, United States

Oran

 Alicante, Spain
 Bordeaux, France
 Dakar, Senegal
 Durban, South Africa
 Havana, Cuba
 Jeddah, Saudi Arabia
 Sfax, Tunisia
 Zarqa, Jordan

Sétif

 Lyon, France
 Rennes, France
 Tangier, Morocco

Tizi Ouzou

 Monastir, Tunisia
 La Roche-sur-Yon, France

Tlemcen

 Granada, Spain
 Lille, France
 Montpellier, France
 Nanterre, France
 Sarajevo, Bosnia and Herzegovina

Angola
Cabinda
 Campinas, Brazil

Huambo

 Amadora, Portugal
 Caldas da Rainha, Portugal
 Castelo Branco, Portugal

Lobito

 Lowell, United States
 Seixal, Portugal
 Sintra, Portugal

Luanda

 Belo Horizonte, Brazil
 Houston, United States
 Lisbon, Portugal
 Oaxaca de Juárez, Mexico
 Porto, Portugal
 Salvador, Brazil

Lubango

 Caldas da Rainha, Portugal
 Santarém, Portugal

Benin
Abomey
 Ostrava, Czech Republic

Cotonou

 Abidjan, Ivory Coast
 Atlanta, United States
 Rosny-sous-Bois, France
 Taipei, Taiwan

Djougou

 Évreux, France
 Al Wakrah, Qatar

Porto-Novo
 Lyon, France

Botswana
Francistown

 Genk, Belgium
 Tai'an, China

Gaborone
 Burbank, United States

Burkina Faso
Bobo-Dioulasso

 Bamako, Mali
 Bouaké, Ivory Coast
 Châlons-en-Champagne, France
 Fez, Morocco

Boussé
 Decatur, United States

Douroula
 Besançon, France

Fada N'gourma

 Épernay, France
 Great Barrington, United States

Garango

 Ladenburg, Germany
 Laval, France

Kaya
 Savannah, United States

Ouagadougou

 Bordeaux, France
 Briton Ferry, Wales, United Kingdom
 Grenoble, France
 Leuze-en-Hainaut, Belgium
 Loudun, France
 Lyon, France
 Nice, France
 Taipei, Taiwan
 Zhengzhou, China

Ouahigouya

 Chambéry, France
 Decatur, United States

Saponé
 Brest, France

Burundi
Bujumbura

 Cape Town, South Africa
 Hefei, China

Cameroon
Bamenda

 Dordrecht, Netherlands
 Lowell, United States

Douala

 Philadelphia, United States
 Taiyuan, China

Limbe
 Seattle, United States

Yaoundé

 Edessa, Greece
 Shenyang, China
 Udine, Italy

Cape Verde

Central African Republic
Bangui
 Çankaya, Turkey

Chad
N'Djamena

 Istanbul, Turkey
 Liuzhou, China
 Stupino, Russia

Congo
Brazzaville

 Bolingbrook, United States
 Changsha, China
 Dakar, Senegal
 Dresden, Germany
 Havana, Cuba
 Kinshasa, Democratic Republic of the Congo

 Nouakchott, Mauritania
 Reims, France

Pointe-Noire

 Dalian, China
 New Orleans, United States
 Suzhou, China

Democratic Republic of the Congo
Bukavu
 Palermo, Italy

Kinshasa

 Ankara, Turkey
 Brazzaville, Congo
 Dakar, Senegal

Lubumbashi
 Liège, Belgium

Djibouti
Djibouti City

 Saint Paul, United States
 Sancaktepe, Turkey

Egypt

Equatorial Guinea
Malabo

 Guadalajara, Mexico
 Madrid, Spain

Eswatini
Manzini
 Keighley, England, United Kingdom

Mbabane

 Fort Worth, United States
 Matola, Mozambique
 Mbombela, South Africa
 Taipei, Taiwan

Ethiopia
Adama
 Aurora, United States

Addis Ababa

 Ankara, Turkey
 Beersheba, Israel
 Beijing, China
 Chuncheon, South Korea
 Harare, Zimbabwe
 Johannesburg, South Africa
 Khartoum, Sudan
 Leipzig, Germany
 Lusaka, Zambia
 Lyon, France
 Nairobi, Kenya
 Washington, D.C., United States

Axum
 Denver, United States

Bahir Dar

 Ashdod, Israel
 Cleveland, United States
 Madison, United States
 Oakland, United States

Dire Dawa
 Shijiazhuang, China

Gondar

 Corvallis, United States
 Montgomery County, United States
 Rishon LeZion, Israel

Mekelle

 Ramla, Israel
 Witten, Germany

Gabon
Libreville

 Durban, South Africa
 Nice, France

Gambia
Banjul

 Dakar, Senegal
 Doha, Qatar
 Nanning, China
 Ostend, Belgium
 Taipei, Taiwan

Kanifing

 Madison, United States
 Memphis, United States

Ghana
Aboadze
 Buffalo, United States

Accra

 Akron, United States
 Cape Town, South Africa
 Cheyenne, United States
 Chicago, United States
 Columbia, United States
 Columbus, United States
 North Miami Beach, United States

Cape Coast

 Bonn, Germany
 Buffalo, United States
 Hanover Park, United States
 New Orleans, United States

Kumasi

 Charlotte, United States
 Newark, United States
 Wenzhou, China
 Winston-Salem, United States

Sekondi-Takoradi

 Boston, United States
 Oakland, United States

Sunyani
 Tuscaloosa, United States

Tamale
 Louisville, United States

Techiman
 Tuscaloosa, United States

Tema

 Columbia, United States
 Greenwich, England, United Kingdom
 Norfolk, United States
 San Diego, United States

Winneba 

 Birmingham, United States
 Charlottesville, United States
 Lowell, United States

Guinea
Conakry

 Cleveland, United States
 Dakar, Senegal

Guinea-Bissau
Bissau

 Águeda, Portugal
 Ankara, Turkey
 Dakar, Senegal
 Lisbon, Portugal
 Sintra, Portugal
 Taipei, Taiwan

Cacheu
 Lisbon, Portugal

Ivory Coast
Abidjan

 Cotonou, Benin
 Marseille, France
 Nice, France
 San Francisco, United States
 São Paulo, Brazil
 Tianjin, China
 Viseu, Portugal

Anyama
 Pontault-Combault, France

Bouaké

 Bobo-Dioulasso, Burkina Faso
 Coslada, Spain
 Villeneuve-sur-Lot, France

Daloa

 Campinas, Brazil
 Pau, France

Man
 Besançon, France

Kenya

Lesotho
Hlotse
 Crymych, Wales, United Kingdom

Maseru
 Austin, United States

Liberia
Barclayville
 Lowell, United States

Buchanan
 Winston-Salem, United States

Gbarnga
 Baltimore, United States

Monrovia

 Dayton, United States
 Taipei, Taiwan

Libya
Benghazi
 Istanbul, Turkey

Tripoli

 Belo Horizonte, Brazil
 Cairo, Egypt
 Madrid, Spain
 El Mina, Lebanon
 Sarajevo, Bosnia and Herzegovina

Madagascar
Antsirabe

 Montluçon, France
 Stavanger, Norway
 Vacoas-Phoenix, Mauritius

Antsiranana
 Port Louis, Mauritius

Antananarivo

 Montreal, Canada
 Nanning, China
 Nice, France
 Suzhou, China
 Vorkuta, Russia
 Yerevan, Armenia

Malawi
Blantyre

 Hanover, Germany
 Kaohsiung, Taiwan

Lilongwe

 Nanning, China
 Taipei, Taiwan

Zomba
 Urbana, United States

Mali
Bamako

 Angers, France
 Ashgabat, Turkmenistan
 Bobo-Dioulasso, Burkina Faso
 Bordeaux, France
 Dakar, Senegal
 Nouakchott, Mauritania
 Rochester, United States

Ségou

 Angoulême, France
 Richmond, United States

Timbuktu

 Chemnitz, Germany
 Hay-on-Wye, Wales, United Kingdom
 Kairouan, Tunisia
 Marrakesh, Morocco
 Saintes, France
 Tempe, United States

Mauritania
Nouadhibou

 Casablanca, Morocco
 Fuzhou, China
 Las Palmas, Spain

Nouakchott

 Bamako, Mali
 Dakar, Senegal
 East Jerusalem, Palestine
 Lanzhou, China
 Madrid, Spain

Mauritius
Beau Bassin-Rose Hill
 Changzhou, China

Grand Port

 Baie Lazare, Seychelles
 Qingdao, China
 Spelthorne, England, United Kingdom
 Tsiafahy, Madagascar

Port Louis

 Alexandria, Egypt
 Antsiranana, Madagascar
 Dakar, Senegal
 Doha, Qatar
 Foshan, China
 Karachi, Pakistan
 Lamentin, Guadeloupe, France
 Maputo, Mozambique
 Port Mathurin, Mauritius
 La Possession, Réunion, France
 Pretoria, South Africa
 Saint-Malo, France

Quatre Bornes

 Ambalavao, Madagascar
 Daqing, China
 Saint-Benoît, Réunion, France

Vacoas-Phoenix

 Antsirabe, Madagascar
 Pune, India
 Sainte-Suzanne, Réunion, France

Morocco

Mozambique
Beira

 Arganil, Portugal
 Boston, United States
 Bristol, England, United Kingdom
 Coimbra, Portugal
 Padua, Italy
 Porto, Portugal
 Seixal, Portugal
 Sintra, Portugal

Maputo

 Ankara, Turkey
 Chengdu, China
 Durban, South Africa
 Guarulhos, Brazil
 Jakarta, Indonesia
 Lisbon, Portugal
 Rio de Janeiro, Brazil
 Port Louis, Mauritius
 Shanghai, China

Pemba
 Reggio Emilia, Italy

Namibia
Windhoek

 Berlin, Germany
 Havana, Cuba
 Johannesburg, South Africa
 Kingston, Jamaica
 Nanjing, China
 Richmond, United States
 San Antonio, United States
 Shanghai, China
 Suzhou, China
 Trossingen, Germany

Walvis Bay

 Drakenstein, South Africa
 Kristiansand, Norway
 Lobatse, Botswana
 Wenzhou, China

Niger
Niamey
 Ankara, Turkey

Nigeria
Asaba
 Stockton, United States

Ibadan
 Cleveland, United States

Ifẹ

 Oberlin, United States
 Salvador, Brazil
 San Bernardino, United States

Lagos

 Atlanta, United States
 Belo Horizonte, Brazil
 Bucharest, Romania
 Port of Spain, Trinidad and Tobago

Onitsha

 Compton, United States
 Indianapolis, United States

Orlu
 Austin, United States

Osogbo

 Asheville, United States
 Wilmington, United States

Owerri
 Gresham, United States

Port Harcourt
 Kansas City, United States

Rwanda
Kigali

 Oklahoma City, United States
 San Bernardino, United States

São Tomé and Principe
Lobata
 Seixal, Portugal

Lembá

 Moura, Portugal
 Porto, Portugal
 Santa Marta de Penaguião, Portugal

Mé-Zóchi

 Guimarães, Portugal
 Tarrafal, Cape Verde

Príncipe

 Amadora, Portugal
 Faro, Portugal
 Marco de Canaveses, Portugal
 Oeiras, Portugal

São Tomé
 Lisbon, Portugal

Senegal
Dakar

 Ann Arbor, United States
 Baku, Azerbaijan
 Bamako, Mali
 Banjul, Gambia
 Bissau, Guinea-Bissau
 Brazzaville, Congo
 Casablanca, Morocco
 Conakry, Guinea
 Dijon, France
 Isfahan, Iran
 Kinshasa, Democratic Republic of the Congo
 Marseille, France
 Miami-Dade County, United States
 Milan, Italy
 Nouakchott, Mauritania
 Oran, Algeria
 Port Louis, Mauritius
 Rosario, Argentina
 Sfax, Tunisia
 Taipei, Taiwan
 Washington, D.C., United States

Diourbel 
 Avignon, France

Guédiawaye
 Birmingham, United States

Kaolack

 Aosta, Italy
 Mérignac, France

M'Bour

 Concarneau, France
 Jackson, United States
 Molenbeek-Saint-Jean, Belgium

Rufisque

 Hénin-Beaumont, France
 Rio de Janeiro, Brazil

Saint-Louis

 Bologna, Italy
 Fez, Morocco
 Liège, Belgium
 Lille, France
 St. Louis, United States

Thiès

 Caen, France
 Cayenne, French Guiana, France
 Solingen, Germany
 Sousse, Tunisia

Ziguinchor

 Compiègne, France
 Rimini, Italy
 Saint-Maur-des-Fossés, France
 São Filipe, Cape Verde

Seychelles
Victoria

 Haikou, China
 Hanoi, Vietnam
 Panaji, India

Sierra Leone
Freetown

 Charleston, United States

 Hefei, China
 Kansas City, United States
 Kingston upon Hull, England, United Kingdom
 New Haven, United States

Somalia
Galkayo
 Bursa, Turkey

Mogadishu

 Ankara, Turkey
 Doha, Qatar
 Saint Paul, United States

South Africa

Sudan
El-Gadarif
 Khan Yunis, Palestine

Khartoum

 Addis Ababa, Ethiopia
 Ankara, Turkey
 Brasília, Brazil
 Cairo, Egypt
 Istanbul, Turkey
 Manisa, Turkey
 Saint Petersburg, Russia
 Tehran, Iran
 Wuhan, China

Tanzania
Arusha

 Durham, United States
 Mürzzuschlag, Austria
 Kansas City, United States
 Tifariti, Western Sahara

Dar es Salaam

 Changzhou, China
 Hamburg, Germany
 Liuzhou, China
 Samsun, Turkey

Dodoma
 Linz, Austria

Moshi

 Delray Beach, United States
 Halmstad, Sweden
 Tübingen, Germany

Mtwara
 Redditch, England, United Kingdom

Musoma
 Calderdale, England, United Kingdom

Mwanza
 Würzburg, Germany

Singida
 Salzburg, Austria

Tanga

 Eckernförde, Germany
 Toledo, United States

Zanzibar City

 Haikou, China
 Potsdam, Germany
 Sakarya, Turkey

Togo
Atakpamé
 Niort, France

Dapaong
 Issy-les-Moulineaux, France

Kpalimé
 Bressuire, France

Lomé

 Duisburg, Germany
 Shenzhen, China
 Taipei, Taiwan

Tsévié

 Parthenay, France
 Plainfaing, France

Tunisia

Uganda
Entebbe

 Ashkelon, Israel
 Kalmar, Sweden
 Wuhan, China

Western Sahara
Bir Lehlou

 Campi Bisenzio, Italy
 Montevarchi, Italy
 Novelda, Spain
 Pozuelo de Alarcón, Spain
 Prato, Italy

Zambia
Kasama
 Clovis, United States

Kitwe

 Baia Mare, Romania
 Detroit, United States

Livingstone

 Funchal, Portugal
 Santa Fe, United States

Lusaka

 Addis Ababa, Ethiopia
 Albuquerque, United States
 Białystok, Poland
 Dushanbe, Tajikistan
 Los Angeles, United States
 Nanjing, China

Ndola

 Makhachkala, Russia
 Porto, Portugal

Zimbabwe
Bulawayo

 Aberdeen, Scotland, United Kingdom
 Pretoria, South Africa

Harare

 Addis Ababa, Ethiopia
 Cincinnati, United States
 Guangzhou, China 
 Kazan, Russia
 Munich, Germany
 Nottingham, England, United Kingdom

Mutare
 Portland, United States

References